Gareth Gorman (born 14 June 1974) is an Irish former footballer.

Playing career
Gareth played in the League of Ireland for 10 years, at various clubs, finishing his career at Sligo Rovers.

Coaching career
Appointed as Sean Connor's assistant at Galway United before the 2010 League of Ireland season. He now coaches NUI Galway in the Galway & District League.

See also
Association football in the Republic of Ireland
List of football clubs in Ireland

References

1974 births
Association football midfielders
Derry City F.C. players
Sligo Rovers F.C. players
Galway United F.C. (1937–2011) players
Living people
Republic of Ireland association footballers